Dianne is a Canadian music variety television series which aired on CBC Television 1971.

Premise
This Winnipeg-produced series was hosted by singer Dianne Heatherington and focused on rock music performances. Series regulars included the Merry Go Round and the Dave Shaw Orchestra. Bands and artists such as Brave Belt, Chilliwack, Next, North, Tom Northcott, Sweet Honey Mead and Wild Rice appeared.

Scheduling
This half-hour series was broadcast Mondays at 7:30 p.m. from 5 July to 13 September 1971.

References

External links
 

CBC Television original programming
1971 Canadian television series debuts
1971 Canadian television series endings
1970s Canadian variety television series
1970s Canadian music television series